Una Lettera dall'Africa is a 1951 Italian documentary film directed by Leonardo Bonzi, with Manulo Lualdi.
	
The film, a documentary, shot in then state-of-the art Ferrania Color in Northern Africa, was produced by the Istituto Luce and was distributed by DEAR Film. It was screened at the Venice Film Festival from 1 to 30 September 1951.
In 2018 it was screened at the Crema Film Festival.

The film documents a trip by car from Tripoli, Libya to Mogadishu, Somalia, covering the natural landscape and wildlife and documenting various civilizations and local customs along the way. The film also documents historical events and the locations of the battles, and the work of Italian missionaries across the region. The trip takes the viewer along the Mediterranean coast and along the Nile enroute. Una Lettera dall'Africa is described as having a journalistic tone with poetic elements.

References

External links
 

1951 films
1950s Italian-language films
Italian documentary films
1951 documentary films
1950s Italian films